The Archdiocese of Gitega the Metropolitan See for the Ecclesiastical province of Gitega in Burundi.

History

 12 December 1912: Apostolic Vicariate of Kivu formed from parts of the Apostolic Vicariate of Unyanyembe and the Apostolic Vicariate of Southern Victoria Nyanza.
 1921: Apostolic Vicariate of Kivu renamed the Apostolic Vicariate of Urundi and Kivu 
 25 April 1922: Apostolic Vicariate of Urundi and Kivu divided into the Apostolic Vicariate of Urundi and the Apostolic Vicariate of Ruanda.
 14 July 1949: Apostolic Vicariate of Urundi renamed the Apostolic Vicariate of Kitega 
 10 November 1959: Apostolic Vicariate of Kitega promoted as Metropolitan Archdiocese of Gitega

Bishops

Ordinaries, in reverse chronological order

Metropolitan Archbishops of Gitega (Roman rite), below
Archbishop Simon Ntamwana – since 24 January 1997
Archbishop Joachim Ruhuna (6 November 1982  – 9 September 1996)
Archbishop André Makarakiza, M. Afr. (5 September 1968  – 6 November 1982)
Archbishop Antoine Grauls, M. Afr. (10 November 1959  – 16 October 1967); see below
 Vicar Apostolic of Kitega (Roman rite) 
 Bishop Antoine Grauls, M. Afr. (14 July 1949  – 10 November 1959); see above & below
Vicars Apostolic of Urundi (Roman rite) 
 Bishop Antoine Grauls, M. Afr. (23 December 1936  – 14 July 1949); see above
 Bishop Julien-Louis-Edouard-Marie Gorju, M. Afr. (26 April 1922  – 29 May 1936)

Coadjutor archbishop
Joachim Ruhuna (1980-1982)

Auxiliary bishops
Gabriel Kihimbare (1964), never consecrated
Nestor Bihonda (1965-1968), appointed Bishop of Muyinga

Other priests of this diocese who became bishops
Bonaventure Nahimana, appointed Bishop of Rutana in 2009
Blaise Nzeyimana, appointed Bishop of Ruyigi in 2010

Suffragan dioceses
Diocese of Muyinga
Diocese of Ngozi
Diocese of Rutana
Diocese of Ruyigi

References

Roman Catholic dioceses in Burundi
Roman Catholic Ecclesiastical Province of Gitega
Christian organizations established in 1912
Roman Catholic dioceses and prelatures established in the 20th century
1912 establishments in German East Africa
Gitega